The pontine arteries are a number of small arteries which come off at right angles from either side of the basilar artery and supply the pons and adjacent parts of the brain. The pontine arteries include the paramedian arteries, the short circumferential, and the long circumferential arteries.

See also
 Superior cerebellar artery

Notes

References

Additional images

Arteries of the head and neck